Noah Nickolas Perry (born August 1, 1950) is an American politician and diplomat who has served as the United States ambassador to Jamaica since 2022. He served as a member of the New York State Assembly for the 58th district from 1993 to 2022. His former district included the neighborhood of East Flatbush, as well as portions of Canarsie and Brownsville, among other neighborhoods located in the borough of Brooklyn.

Early life and education
Born and raised in Saint Andrew Parish, Jamaica, Noah Nickolas Perry graduated from Kingston College in Kingston, Jamaica. Perry graduated from Brooklyn College with a Bachelor of Arts degree in political science. He later returned to Brooklyn College to study for an Master of Arts in public policy and administration.

Career 
He worked at the Bustamante Industrial Trade Union before immigrating to the United States in 1971. The following year he volunteered for the United States Army, from which he was honorably discharged at the rank of Specialist Five in 1978 after having served as an active-duty serviceman for two years and inactive reserve for four years.

Politics
In 1983, Perry was appointed as a member of Brooklyn Community Board 17. He later served as chairman of that board and the following year he ran as a candidate for District Leader in the 42nd Assembly District. He would later serve as a member of the Executive Board of the 67th Police Precinct and as a director of Flatbush East Community Development Corporation.

In 1992, following the 1990 Census, a new assembly district was added in Brooklyn, located in East Flatbush. Perry won new 58th district seat in the November 1992 election.

Since 2001, Perry has been the vice-chair of the Assembly Majority Conference and majority whip. He also serves on the New York State Assembly Committees on Ways & Means, Rules, Codes, Labor, Transportation and Banks.

In 2006, Perry declared his candidacy for New York's 11th congressional district, which was being vacated by retiring Congressman Major Owens. In May 2006, he withdrew from the congressional race and endorsed eventual leader Yvette Clarke.

Perry ran uncontested in his 2008, 2010 and 2012 general elections for State Assembly.

Biden administration 
In November 2021, Perry was nominated to serve as United States ambassador to Jamaica. Hearings on his nomination were held before the Senate's Foreign Relations Committee on February 8, 2022. On March 8, 2022, the committee favorably reported Perry's nomination to the Senate floor. Perry was confirmed by the entire Senate on March 10, 2022, via voice vote. On May 13, 2022, he presented his credentials to Governor-General of Jamaica Sir Patrick Allen.

Personal life
He and his wife Joyce reside in the East Flatbush neighborhood of Brooklyn. Perry's granddaughter is Justine Skye, a Roc Nation recording artist.

References

External links
Yassky Strategy Criticism of David Yassky by his former primary opponent.
House Candidate Withdraws, Afraid of Splitting Black Vote
Councilman Wants to Fine ‘Dollar Van’ Riders

1950 births
Living people
20th-century American politicians
21st-century American diplomats
21st-century American politicians
African-American diplomats
Ambassadors of the United States to Jamaica
American politicians of Jamaican descent
Brooklyn College alumni
Democratic Party members of the New York State Assembly
United States Army reservists
United States Army soldiers